Allboom is the second studio album of Montenegrin hip hop group Monteniggers, which was released in 1998.

Songs 

The album contains 11 songs. The track listings are as follows:

1. Intro  
2. Strašilo  
3. 2028 (Ko to zna)  
4. Jean Claude  
5. Što ja imam s tim  
6. Tako ti je - kako ti je  
7. Aj.. aj.. (pa se kroz grad zajebaj)  
8. Robot  
9. Ko je sprštio Baba Joku na džadu?  
10. Voljeli bi da si tu (dedicated to Duško Nikolić)  
11. Ko nagazna mina

References 

1998 albums